Topsy Smith (1875 – 15 April 1960) was an Arabunna woman born at Oodnadatta is a pioneer of Central Australia in the Northern Territory of Australia. She spent her life caring for Indigenous children at an institution known as The Bungalow in Alice Springs.

Early life, marriage and children
Topsy Smith was born around 1875, the daughter of Mary Kemp, who was of Arabunna descent, from the Oodnadatta area, in northeast South Australia. She married a Welsh miner William "Bill" Smith who was working at the Arltunga goldfields. They had eleven children, the eldest of whom was bushman Walter Smith. When Bill died in 1914, Smith decided to return to the Oodnadatta area, but only made it as far as Alice Springs, then known as Stuart. She was pregnant at the time and was accompanied by seven of her children and a herd of goats. Walter remained in Arltunga to work.

Topsy and her children were assisted by pastoralists Jane and Ted Hayes from Undoolya Station, with whom they lived for some time before moving on to Alice Springs. When she arrived in Alice Springs, Smith lived in a tent. She herded her goats on a hill which was then the outskirts of town, a place that became known as Billy Goat Hill.

The Bungalow

Eventually the sergeant of police Robert Stott constructed a shed where she was permitted to live. The shed eventually became known as The Bungalow, an institution and school for Aboriginal children of mixed descent (at the time, referred to as "half-caste". The school was moved from the iron shed behind the police station to Jay Creek and then to the Alice Springs Telegraph Station in November 1932.

Along with Ida Standley, Smith became actively involved in the running and management of the school, responsible for the children's welfare. She was known to have cared for the children as her own.

Death and legacy

Smith died in the Alice Springs hospital on 15 April 1960. She is celebrated in the Women's Museum of Australia in Alice Springs.

The Topsy Smith Hostel in Alice Springs, which provides long-term accommodation for Aboriginal and Torres Strait Islander renal patients and their carers, is named after her.

Topsy Smith House, a house at St Philip's College, a private school in Alice Springs, is named after her.

A painting of Smith entitled Arltunga to Alice by her great granddaughter, artist Linda Smith Penangke, was a finalist in the 2010 Moreton Bay Region Art Award.

References

People from Alice Springs
1960 deaths
1870s births